James Douglas Jennings (born September 30, 1964) is a former professional baseball player who played in the Major Leagues primarily as a utility player from 1988–1991 and 1993.

Jennings played for Nippon Professional Baseball's Orix BlueWave for three seasons (–).

Early career (1984–1987)
Jennings was drafted by the Angels in the 2nd round of the 1984 MLB Draft. He started his professional career in Salem. In 1985, he was brought up to Quad Cities. In 1986, he was brought up to Palm Springs. In 1987, he was brought up to Midland. After the season, he was selected by the Oakland Athletics in the Rule V Draft on December 7, 1987.

Career with the Oakland A's (1987–1991)
Doug made his Major League debut with the Oakland A's In 1988. His major league career got off to a quick start in April 1988 for Oakland. The Athletics had taken him from the Angels system the previous off-season. Now, in his first major-league start, Jennings went 4 for 4, hitting a home run and scoring four times.

Career with the Chicago Cubs (1993)
Doug arrived in Chicago from Des Moines around 5 pm Tuesday, June 1. Four hours later, his pinch-hit double broke a seventh-inning tie and sparked the Cubs to an 8–3 victory over the New York Mets in front of another 30,000-plus in drizzly Wrigley Field.

Japan – Orix BlueWave (1995–1997)
"DJ" played in Japan for 3 years with the Orix BlueWave, teammates with Ichiro all three seasons, Doug batted in the lineup in either the 3 or 4 hole and helped lead Orix to consecutive NPB series, losing in 1995 and winning in 1996. In game 4 of the 1995 series DJ hit an extra-inning HR which proved to be the game winner, for the only game they won in the series which they lost 4 games to 1. One of the highlights of his time in Japan was tying a Japanese HR record by hitting home runs in four consecutive at-bats.

Atlantic League (1999–2005)
In 1999 Jennings played for the Newark Bears and on July 16, 1999 he hit the game-winning home run in the 10th inning in the first game at Bears & Eagles Riverfront Stadium. From 2000 to 2005 Jennings played for the Long Island Ducks also of the independent Atlantic League.

References

External links
, or Retrosheet, or Pelota Binaria (Venezuelan Winter League)

1964 births
Living people
Águilas del Zulia players
American expatriate baseball players in Mexico
American expatriate baseball players in Japan
Baseball players from Atlanta
Cafeteros de Córdoba players
Cardenales de Lara players
American expatriate baseball players in Venezuela
Chicago Cubs players
Indianapolis Indians players
Iowa Cubs players
Long Island Ducks players
Major League Baseball first basemen
Major League Baseball left fielders
Major League Baseball right fielders
Mexican League baseball outfielders
Midland Angels players
Newark Bears players
Nippon Professional Baseball first basemen
Nippon Professional Baseball outfielders
Oakland Athletics players
Olmecas de Tabasco players
Omaha Golden Spikes players
Orix BlueWave players
Palm Springs Angels players
Quad Cities Angels players
Rochester Red Wings players
Salem Angels players
Tacoma Tigers players
Leon High School alumni